Amy Marie Palmer (born April 20, 1975, in Tooele, Utah) is a retired female hammer thrower from the United States. Her personal best throw was 68.28 metres, achieved on April 29, 2000, in Philadelphia.

She was the bronze medalist at the 1998 Goodwill Games. At the 1999 World Championships in Athletics she competed in the earlier stages but she reached the final at the 2000 Sydney Olympics, finishing in eighth place.

Achievements

External links

1975 births
Living people
American female hammer throwers
Athletes (track and field) at the 2000 Summer Olympics
Olympic track and field athletes of the United States
People from Tooele, Utah
Track and field athletes from Utah
Goodwill Games medalists in athletics
Competitors at the 1998 Goodwill Games
21st-century American women